Gail Vaz-Oxlade (born June 18, 1959, in Jamaica) is a Jamaican-Canadian financial writer and television personality who lives in Brighton, Ontario, Canada. Vaz-Oxlade hosts the Canadian television series Til Debt Do Us Part, Princess and, most recently, Money Moron. Vaz-Oxlade is also a regular columnist for Yahoo! Canada Finance. Previously, she was a regular feature writer for The Globe and Mail, Chatelaine magazine, IE: Money and MoneySense.ca, among others.  Gail most recently ventured into the divorce realm by offering financially based divorce services through Common Sense Divorce.

Career
Vaz-Oxlade began her career after moving to Canada, working as an administrative assistant and later taking a job in marketing. In that role she was asked by a banking client to write a manual for its employees on its Registered Retirement Savings Plan products, which grew into Vaz-Oxlade writing all of the bank's technical materials. Within a number of years, Vaz-Oxlade began freelance writing, ultimately writing 27 columns every month.

Citing burn-out, Vaz-Oxlade quit and moved to Brighton, Ontario with her family and over a two-year period did  volunteer work and raised her family. After that time, she was asked by a production company to host Til Debt Do Us Part. In her role on that show, Vaz-Oxlade describes herself as a "super nanny for money". After seven seasons of hosting the program, Vaz-Oxlade agreed to continue with the show if the network, Slice, allowed her to do a new show. The network agreed, resulting in the creation of Princess, which focuses on young women rather than couples.

In 2011, Vaz-Oxlade began a campaign advocating for changes in the way lenders assess lending criteria, particularly for credit cards. As part of that effort, Vaz-Oxlade urged Canadian consumers to stop using their credit cards for one week and pay cash only; as well, she urged Canadians to write to their Members of Parliament to urge changes in legislation restricting the use of credit scores in the granting of credit.

Personal life
Born Gail Elizabeth Theresa Vaz to a wealthy family in Jamaica, Vaz-Oxlade emigrated to Canada with her family in 1977.  Her surname is the result of hyphenating her maiden name and her first husband's surname. She has been married three times: the first marriage lasted one year; the second lasted nine years; and the third lasted eighteen years. However, Vaz-Oxlade, in a money-saving endeavour, has not divorced her last husband. Rather, they are legally separated. Vaz-Oxlade has two children, Alexandra (Alex) Kaitlin Prue and Malcolm Kenneth Prue.

Books
Vaz-Oxlade has written numerous books, including:

The RRSP Answer Book (Stoddart annually 1991–1998)
The Borrower's Answer Book (Stoddart 1993)
The Retirement Answer Book (Stoddart 1994,1996,1997)
Shopping for Money: Strategies for Successful Borrowing (Stoddart 1992,1999)
The Money Tree Myth: A Parents Guide to Helping Kids Unravel the Mysteries of Money (Stoddart 1993,1996)
A Woman of Independent Means: A Woman's Guide to Full Financial Security (Stoddart 1999)
Dead Cat Bounce: The Skinny of E-Vesting (Prentice Hall 2001)
Divorce: A Canadian Woman's Guide (Prentice Hall 2002)
Education Planning (CCH Canadian 1999)
Debt-Free Forever:Take Control of Your Money and Your Life (HarperCollins 2009)
Never Too Late: Take Control of Your Retirement and Your Future (HarperCollins 2010)
Debt-Free Forever:Take Control of Your Money and Your Life US Edition (Experiment 2010) 
Easy Money (Grass Roots Press 2011)
Money-Smart Kids (HarperCollins 2011)
It's Your Money: Becoming a Woman of Independent Means (HarperCollins 2011)
Money Rules: Rule Your Money, Or Your Money Will Rule You (HarperCollins 2012)
Saving for School: Understand RESPs, Take Control of Your Savings, Minimize Student Debt (HarperCollins 2013)
Never Too Late: Take Control of Your Retirement and Your Future Revised Edition (HarperCollins 2013) 
Money Talks: When to Say Yes and How to Say No (2015)

References

External links
Official website
commonsensedivorce website

Living people
1959 births
Canadian television hosts
Canadian columnists
Canadian women columnists
Canadian women television hosts
Jamaican emigrants to Canada
Canadian finance and investment writers